Wilcox Township may refer to the following places:

 Wilcox Township, Hancock County, Illinois
 Wilcox Township, Trego County, Kansas
 Wilcox Township, Newaygo County, Michigan
 Wilcox Township, Roger Mills County, Oklahoma

See also

Wilcox (disambiguation)

Township name disambiguation pages